The Japanese destroyer {{nihongo|Tade|蓼|}} was one of 21 s built for the Imperial Japanese Navy (IJN) in the late 1910s.

Design and description
The Momi class was designed with higher speed and better seakeeping than the preceding  second-class destroyers. Tade was powered by two Parsons geared steam turbines, each driving one propeller shaft using steam provided by three Kampon water-tube boilers. Their crew consisted of 110 officers and crewmen.

The main armament of the Momi-class ships consisted of three  Type 3 guns in single mounts; one gun forward of the well deck, one between the two funnels, and the last gun atop the aft superstructure. The guns were numbered '1' to '3' from front to rear. The ships carried two above-water twin sets of  torpedo tubes; one mount was in the well deck between the forward superstructure and the bow gun and the other between the aft funnel and aft superstructure.

In 1940, Tade was converted into a patrol boat. Her torpedo tubes, minesweeping gear, and aft 12 cm gun were removed in exchange for two triple mounts for license-built  Type 96 light AA guns and 60 depth charges.

Construction and career

Tade, built at the Fujinagata Shipyards in Osaka, was laid down on December 20, 1920, launched on March 15, 1922 and completed on July 31, 1922. During 1940, she was converted into a patrol boat and was renamed Patrol Boat No. 39 on April 1. She was struck from the naval list on July 1, 1943.

Notes

References

1922 ships
Ships built by Fujinagata Shipyards
Momi-class destroyers